Tahesia Gaynell Harrigan-Scott (born 15 February 1982) is a sprinter from the British Virgin Islands. She was the first woman to represent the British Virgin Islands at the Olympics.

Career
Harrigan was born in the Virgin Islands to Doris Harrigan.  Harrigan's illustrious track and field career began in Tallahassee, Florida. As a 14-year-old 9th grader, she carried Florida A&M University's Developmental and Research High School female track team to its first Class 1-A Florida High School Athletic Association state track and field championship win in over ten years by sweeping the 100 metres, 200 metres, the long jump and triple jump.
 
Some other highlights of her prep career include 13 FHSAA State Championship Track and Field victories as an individual or part of a relay team in high school ( 8 of those victories being going undefeated all four years in the 100 and 200 metres, 3 in the long jump, 2 in the triple jump,).

After graduating from high school as salutatorian in the spring of 2000, she was approached by several reputable Florida collegiate track and field programs, but chose the University of Minnesota for its medical program. She red shirted her first year due to a fractured tibia, Harrigan exploded on to the university's conference scene setting school and conference records in the women's 60 m, 100 m, 200 m, and the long jump in 2002. She went on that year to compete as a representative of her country (BVI) in the Central American and Caribbean Games where she had a very good first showing.

In 2004, Harrigan transferred to the University of Alabama where she honed her athletic prowess even further becoming a SEC powerhouse and an NCAA finalist. She earned a bachelor's degree in Psychology in 2005 and a Masters in Speech Pathology in 2007 from Alabama.  She was an All American at the University of Alabama and the University of Minnesota.  She won the 100 metres race at the 2006 Central American and Caribbean Games, and finished fifth at the 2006 Commonwealth Games.  The OECS sports desk named her most outstanding female athlete in 2006 for her top performances in international meets.

Harrigan began her career as a professional sprinter in the spring of 2007. She has competed in several professional track meets in the US and abroad. Of the many sprint-oriented events she competes in, the crown jewel would have to be her current personal record in the 100 metres of 11.13 seconds.

At the 2008 IAAF World Indoor Championships in Valencia, Spain, Harrigan finished third in the final of the Women's 60m posting a new BVI national record of 7.09 sec. At the 2008 Summer Olympics in Beijing she competed at the 100 metres sprint. In her first round heat she placed third behind Christine Arron and Lauryn Williams in a time of 11.46 to advance to the second round. There she failed to qualify for the semi-finals as her time of 11.36 was only the fifth time of her heat, causing elimination.

Anti-doping rule violation
Harrigan-Scott tested positive for the stimulant methylhexaneamine in 2011, and was subsequently handed a 6-month ban from sports.

Personal bests

Achievements

References

External links
 
 
 Tilastopaja biography

1982 births
Living people
Athletes (track and field) at the 2002 Commonwealth Games
Athletes (track and field) at the 2006 Commonwealth Games
Athletes (track and field) at the 2010 Commonwealth Games
Athletes (track and field) at the 2018 Commonwealth Games
Athletes (track and field) at the 2007 Pan American Games
Athletes (track and field) at the 2008 Summer Olympics
Athletes (track and field) at the 2012 Summer Olympics
Athletes (track and field) at the 2016 Summer Olympics
British Virgin Islands female sprinters
British Virgin Islands emigrants to the United States
Commonwealth Games competitors for the British Virgin Islands
Doping cases in athletics
Olympic athletes of the British Virgin Islands
Pan American Games competitors for the British Virgin Islands
University of Alabama alumni
University of Minnesota alumni
World Athletics Championships athletes for British Virgin Islands
World Athletics Indoor Championships medalists
Athletes (track and field) at the 2015 Pan American Games
Central American and Caribbean Games gold medalists for the British Virgin Islands
Competitors at the 2010 Central American and Caribbean Games
Central American and Caribbean Games medalists in athletics
Olympic female sprinters